Clavidesmus chicae is a species of beetle in the family Cerambycidae. It was described by Giorgi in 1998. It is known from Brazil.

References

Onciderini
Beetles described in 1998